Markus Paschke (born 8 June 1963) is a German politician of the Social Democratic Party (SPD) who has served as a member of the Bundestag from the state of Lower Saxony from 2013 till 2017 and again from 2019 to October 2021.

Political career 
On 4 November 2019 Paschke succeeded Sigmar Gabriel who had resigned his seat in the Bundestag. In parliament, he has since been serving is a member of the Committee for Education, Research and Technology Assessment.

References

External links 

  
 Bundestag biography 

1963 births
Living people
Members of the Bundestag for Lower Saxony
Members of the Bundestag 2017–2021
Members of the Bundestag 2013–2017
Members of the Bundestag for the Social Democratic Party of Germany